No Mercy in This Land is the fourteenth studio album by American artist Ben Harper and the twelfth studio album by the American electric blues harmonica player and bandleader Charlie Musselwhite released by Anti- on March 30, 2018.

Track listing
All tracks composed by Ben Harper; except where indicated

Charts

References

2018 albums
Ben Harper albums
Anti- (record label) albums